Robert Lawrence Kuhn (born November 6, 1944) is a public intellectual, international corporate strategist and investment banker. He has been called “one of the Western world’s most prolific interpreters of Beijing’s policies.”  Outside China Kuhn's work has largely been "panned" as "fawning work of hagiography", pro-China propaganda, or as spouting demonstrably untrue statements, whereas within China, Kuhn's books have reportedly achieved sales records only eclipsed by Harry Potter. Kuhn has a doctorate in neuroscience and is the author and editor of over 25 books. Kuhn is a recipient of the China Reform Friendship Medal, China's highest award; he is a long-time adviser to China's leaders and the Chinese government, to multinational corporations on China strategies and transactions, and is a frequent commentator on the politics, economics, business, finance, philosophy and science of China. Kuhn is a columnist for China Daily and South China Morning Post and appears on the BBC, CNN, China Central Television (CCTV), Bloomberg and other major media. Kuhn is the creator, writer and host of the show Closer to China with R.L. Kuhn and The Watcher and Xi's Deep Message commentaries. Kuhn is the creator, writer and host of the public television series Closer to Truth, which presents scientists and philosophers discussing fundamental issues (cosmos, consciousness, philosophy/religion). Kuhn's presentation, Asking Ultimate Questions, is the foundation of Closer To Truth.

Education

Kuhn received a bachelor's degree in human biology from Johns Hopkins University (Phi Beta Kappa) in 1964, a PhD in anatomy and brain research from the University of California, Los Angeles' Brain Research Institute in 1968 and a Master of Science in management as a Sloan fellow from the MIT Sloan School of Management in 1980.

Career

China

Kuhn was awarded the China Reform Friendship Medal by the Chinese Communist Party (CCP) general secretary and paramount leader Xi Jinping and Chinese leaders at the celebration of the 40th anniversary of China's reform and opening up (December 18, 2018). The medal honors 10 foreigners who facilitated China's reform and opening up over the four decades. Five of the foreigners are living; Kuhn is one of two Americans.

As reported in The Wire China (2020), Kuhn has carved out a niche for himself as one of the Western world’s most prolific interpreters of Beijing’s policies. The brain researcher-turned-investment banker has spent 20 years currying favor with China’s leadership and gaining remarkable access. In fact, with the possible exception of Henry Kissinger and former Goldman Sachs CEO and Secretary of the Treasury Henry Paulson, arguably no other American citizen has spent more time with China’s top leaders.” 

During the 19th National Congress of the CCP, Kuhn was interviewed extensively, including multiple times on CNN, BBC World News and BBC World Service, CGTN, and CCTV, and he was quoted extensively. His full-page, in-depth analyses of the 19th CCP National Congress were featured in China Daily to open the Congress ("Historical Starting Point for New Stage of Development") and to close the Congress ("New Era on the Road to 2050").

Kuhn has written on CCP general secretary Xi Jinping's "core" status in the CCP ("Why China needs Xi Jinping as its core leader"), the elimination of term limits for China's leadership ("Xi Jinping's power has a purpose—one person to see China through its development plans")., and the Sixth Plenum of the CCP Central Committee (November, 2021) ("Sixth plenum: with Xi at the helm, a new era when China becomes strong")

Kuhn provided the live commentary on CNN during CCP general secretary Xi Jinping's policy address in Seattle on September 2, 2015, during Xi's state visit to the US. Kuhn spoke at the launch ceremony of Xi's book, entitled Xi Jinping: The Governance of China, at the Frankfurt Book Fair on October 8, 2014.

Kuhn writes on Xi's Four Comprehensives political theory of governance, and on understanding the CCP.

In 1989, he was invited to China by the director of the State Science and Technology Commission, Song Jian, whom Kuhn considers his mentor.

Kuhn is the author of How China's Leaders Think: The Inside Story of China's Past, Current and Future Leaders, featuring exclusive discussions with more than 100 Chinese leaders and featuring CCP leader Xi Jinping.

He wrote The Man Who Changed China: The Life and Legacy of Jiang Zemin. It was the first biography of a living Chinese leader and was a best-seller in China in 2005. 

Kuhn is the host and co-producer of Closer To China with R.L. Kuhn, a weekly series on China Global Television Network (CGTN); co-created and co-produced by Adam Zhu, it tells the story of China through discussions with China's thought leaders and decision-makers in all sectors.

Kuhn created, writes and presents The Watcher. 

Kuhn is creator, writer and host of the five-part public television TV series China's Challenges, co-produced with Shanghai Media Group and Adam Zhu, and directed by Peter Getzels, which won first prize in China News Award.

The Geneva Companies
From 1991 to 2001, Kuhn was president and co-owner of the Geneva Companies, a mergers and acquisitions (M&A) firm representing privately owned, middle-market companies. In 2000 Kuhn sold the Geneva Companies to Citigroup.

Closer to Truth

Closer to Truth is a continuing television series on PBS and public television stations, created, executive-produced, written and hosted by  Kuhn, and produced and directed by Peter Getzels. The series premiered in 2000. The current series, Closer to Truth: Cosmos. Consciousness. Meaning/God, is in its 19th season. See List of Closer to Truth episodes. The series offers candid, in-depth conversations with leading scientists, philosophers, theologians and scholars, covering Cosmos (cosmology/physics, philosophy of science), Consciousness (brain/mind, philosophy of mind) and Meaning/God (philosophy of religion). The accompanying website features over 4,000 videos of conversations. Kuhn's presentation, Asking Ultimate Questions, is the foundation of Closer To Truth.

Criticism and controversy

In Forbes, Gordon G. Chang wrote that How China’s Leaders Think: the Inside Story of China’s Reform and What This Means for the Future was difficult to even read to completion, saying, "Kuhn stated--on the fifth page of the introduction--that Chinese leaders are not authoritarians. That’s demonstrably untrue, but I struggled on for another hundred pages before finally realizing there was no point in reading a work of propaganda." Chang also wrote, "Kuhn merely repeats what the Communist Party says about itself and accepts its words at face value, taking obsequiousness to new heights."

A book review essay on Kuhn's The Man Who Changed China was written by Bruce Gilley and published  in the Foreign Affairs. Gilley said it was actually better understood as an officially sanctioned autobiography, presenting an image that China's leaders want the world to see. Additionally, he said the writing of the book was, beginning in 2001, overseen by a secret state propaganda team. John Walsh, an assistant Professor at Shinawatra University, presumed that as a result of interviewing people who had favorable views of Jiang Zemin, he said that the first part of this book was "close to hagiography".

In the September/October issue of Foreign Affairs Bruce Gilley—Adjunct Professor of International Affairs at the New School University—reported on conflicts of interest and censorship issues involved in the publication of Kuhn's book from 2005, The Man Who Changed China: The Life and Legacy of Jiang Zemin. Gilley stated that the official government of China had removed as much as 10 percent of the content from the book in the Chinese language version, whereas the English language version was also modified to suit what the Chinese government deemed appropriate for Chinese and non-Chinese audiences to see. Gilley is quoted as saying, 

Kuhn responded in the January/February 2006 issue of Foreign Affairs:

According to The Wire China, in the 17 years since his book’s publication, "Kuhn has regularly deflected accusations that he is a propagandist for the Chinese government. Instead, Kuhn says, he has spent the past few decades 'helping the world understand China and China understand the world' — efforts he hopes are in the best interest of the U.S. and China.” After Jiang Zemin died on November 30, 2022, Kuhn published his personal reflections, concluding, "History will be kind to Jiang Zemin."

References

1944 births
Living people
21st-century American biographers
American business writers
American investment bankers
American science writers
Johns Hopkins University alumni
MIT Sloan Fellows
MIT Sloan School of Management alumni
University of California, Los Angeles alumni